Lake Ioni, also known as Yonai, (Yunin) is a large freshwater lake in Chukotsky District, Chukotka Autonomous Okrug, Russia. Currently there are no permanent settlements on the shores of the lake, but there are remains of Stone Age dwellings. Reindeer herders occasionally visit the area, as well as fishermen.

Geography

The lake is located in the center of the Chukotka Peninsula, south of Kolyuchin Bay. Ioni is the largest lake in its district. It lies in the Mechigmen-Kolyuchin basin, a large intermontane basin of the western part of the Chukotka Mountains. high Mount Ioni rises to the NW of the lake.

Ioni is fed by at least five streams originating in the adjacent mountains. The largest is the Priozernaya that flows into the lake from the northeast. River Yonaypilgyn is the outflow of the lake. Ioni is connected  by the Yuniwei channel with river Ionivaam, part of the drainage basin of Kolyuchin Bay.

The lake freezes in the first half of September and stays under ice until June.

Flora and fauna
The area surrounding Ioni has low mountain tundra vegetation. The banks of the lake are gently sloping and on the eastern side swampy with hummocks and thermokarst pools. There are no aquatic plants.

Anadromous Dolly Varden char is common in the lake. Other fish species include sardine cisco, Siberian whitefish, broad whitefish, burbot, Arctic grayling, as well as Alaska blackfish in shallow thermokarst ponds.

Migratory birds, such as the snow goose, sandhill crane and emperor goose pass through the area and stop at the lake. But owing to the short relatively warm season Ioni is not a suitable place for nesting.

See also
List of lakes of Russia

References

External links 
Озеро Иони - Чукотский автономный округ
Чукотский поход. Часть 2 "Озеро Иони"
Beringia National Park
Lakes of Chukotka Autonomous Okrug

ru:Ёонай